The Edinburgh North by-election was held on 19 May 1960.  It was held due to the appointment of the incumbent Conservative MP, William Rankine Milligan to the Court of Session.  The by-election was won by the Conservative candidate, John Douglas-Scott who would later become Duke of Buccleuch.

References

Edinburgh North by-election
Edinburgh North by-election
Edinburgh North by-election
North, 1960
Edinburgh North by-election